The Valdosta City School District is a public school district in Lowndes County, Georgia, United States, based in Valdosta. It serves the city of Valdosta and the surrounding communities of Lowndes County.

Schools
The Valdosta City School District has five elementary schools, two middle schools, and one high school.

Elementary schools
J. L. Lomax Elementary School
W.G Nunn Elementary School
S.L. Mason Elementary School
Sallas Mahone Elementary School
Pinevale Elementary School
The current building opened in 2013. It was previously known as Southeast Elementary School.

Middle schools
Newbern Middle School
Valdosta Middle School

High school
Valdosta High School

Alternative school
Pinevale Learning Center

Academy
Valdosta Early College Academy

References

External links

School districts in Georgia (U.S. state)
Education in Lowndes County, Georgia